Roger Murdock may refer to:

Roger E. Murdock (1909–1995), police chief
Roger Murdock, drummer for the band King Missile
Roger Murdock, the character played by Kareem Abdul-Jabbar in the film Airplane!